The Carib grackle (Quiscalus lugubris) is a New World tropical blackbird, a resident breeder in the Lesser Antilles and northern South America east of the Andes, from Colombia east to Venezuela and northeastern Brazil. There are eight subspecies, of which the most widespread is the nominate subspecies (Q. l. lugubris) of  Trinidad and the South American mainland. This subspecies was introduced to Tobago in 1905 and is now common there.

Description
Its plumage is entirely black with a violet iridescence, its eyes are yellow, and it has a strong dark bill. Young males are shorter tailed than adult males and have some brown in the plumage. Young females are very similar to the adult females.

The seven island subspecies differ from the nominate one in size, plumage shade (especially in the browns of the females), and vocalisations.

Breeding
The breeding habitat is open areas, including cultivation and human habitation. This is a colonial breeder, with several deep, lined cup nests often being built in one tree. Two to four whitish eggs are laid. Incubation takes 12 days, with a further 14 days to fledging. This species is sometimes parasitised by the shiny cowbird (Molothrus bonariensis), but is quite successful at rejecting the eggs of that species.

Behaviour
The Carib grackle is a highly gregarious species, foraging on the ground for insects, other invertebrates, small fish, small frogs, lizards, or scraps. It is also known to catch small bats in the air. It can become very tame and bold, entering restaurants to seek food, normally feeding on leftovers. It will form groups to attack potential predators, such as dogs, mongooses or humans, and at night it roosts colonially.

Call
The Carib grackle's song is a mixture of harsh and more musical ringing notes, with a bell-like  and a rapid  being typical. The calls vary in dialect between islands and the bird usually fluffs up its feathers when calling.

References

Bibliography

Further reading

External links
 Xeno-canto: audio recordings of the Carib grackle

Carib grackle
Birds of the Lesser Antilles
Birds of Colombia
Birds of Venezuela
Birds of the Guianas
Carib grackle